Monotony Fields is the fourth studio album by Finnish funeral doom metal band Shape of Despair, released on June 15, 2015 by Season of Mist as CD digipak and LP.  It is the first album to feature Henri Koivula on lead vocals. The song "Written in My Scars" was first released on the EP Written in My Scars, but was re-recorded for this album.

Musical style
The album continues the atmospheric funeral doom the band has been playing since their first album Shades of.... It is described as "melancholic and atmospheric", with "morose guitar lines" and "tragic ambient keyboards". The death grunts are "masterfully delivered", the female vocals are "gelid" and "angelic".

Track listing

Personnel

Shape of Despair
 Henri Koivula – vocals
 Natalie Koskinen – vocals
 Jarno Salomaa – guitars & synth
 Tomi Ullgren – guitars
 Sami Uusitalo – bass
 Samu Ruotsalainen – drums

Production
 Max Kostermaa - producer, engineer, mixing
 Mika Jussila - mastering
 Juha Takalo - band logo
 Mariusz Krystew - cover artwork

References

2015 albums
Shape of Despair albums
Season of Mist albums